The 2018 Celtic Cup is the inaugural edition of the Celtic Cup rugby union competition, which features development regional and provincial teams from Ireland and Wales. It ran for six weeks from September 2018 until October 2018. Leinster A won the inaugural edition, beating Scarlets A in the final.

Formation

The Irish Rugby Football Union and the Welsh Rugby Union created a new development competition, the Celtic Cup, for the emerging professional players from the four Irish provinces and four Welsh regions, announcing the tournament in August 2018.

The tournament, which features development squads from Pro14 teams Connacht, Leinster, Munster, Ulster, Cardiff Blues, Dragons, Ospreys and Scarlets, aims to provide a learning environment for development players, coaches and referees by recreating the week-to-week challenges presented by senior professional rugby.

2018 season

The first season of the Celtic Cup ran over seven consecutive weeks in 2018. The eight teams were divided into two conferences of four Welsh regions and four Irish provinces. Each Irish province played each of the Welsh regions and against two Irish provinces. Similarly, the Welsh regions played each of the Irish provinces and two of their Welsh counterparts, giving each team three home and three away fixtures. Derby matches were held on the opening and closing weekends of the pools stage, with the four inter-conference rounds in a block from rounds 2 to 5. The top-ranked province from the Irish conference then played the top-ranked region from the Welsh conference in the Celtic Cup Final.

Conferences

Pool Stage

Round 1

Round 2

Round 3

Round 4

Round 5

Round 6

Grand Final

References

Celtic Cup (2018 rugby union tournament)
2018–19 in European rugby union
2018–19 in Irish rugby union
2018–19 in Welsh rugby union